Mixcoatl (from mixtli  "cloud" and cōātl  "serpent"), or Camaxtle  or Camaxtli, was the god of the hunt and identified with the Milky Way, the stars, and the heavens in several Mesoamerican cultures. He was the patron deity of the Otomi, the Chichimecs, and several groups that claimed descent from the Chichimecs. Under the name of Camaxtli, Mixcoatl was worshipped as the central deity of Huejotzingo and Tlaxcala.

Representation
Mixcoatl is represented with a black mask over his eyes and distinctive red and white pin stripes painted on his body. These features are shared with Tlahuizcalpanteuctli, the Lord of the Dawn, god of the morning star, as well as Itzpapalotl, goddess of infant mortality who was sometimes said to be his mother. Unlike Tlahuizcalpanteuctli, Mixcoatl can usually be distinguished by his hunting gear, which included a bow and arrows, and a net or basket for carrying dead game.

Mythology
Mixcoatl was one of four children of Tonacatecutli, meaning "Lord of Sustenance," an aged creator god, and Cihuacoatl, a fertility goddess and the patroness of midwives. Sometimes Mixcoatl was worshipped as the "Red" aspect of the god Tezcatlipoca, the  "Smoking Mirror," who was the god of sorcerers, rulers, and warriors. In one story, Tezcatlipoca transformed himself into Mixcoatl and invented the fire drill by revolving the heavens around their axes, bringing fire to humanity. Along with this cosmic fire drill, Mixcoatl was the first to strike fire with flint. These events made Mixcoatl a god of the Milky Way, along with war, and the hunt.

Mixcoatl was the father of 400 sons, collectively known as the Centzon Huitznahua, who ended up having their hearts eaten by Huitzilopochtli. The Centzon Huitznahua met their demise when they, and their sister Coyolxauhqui, after finding their mother Coatlicue pregnant, conspired to kill her. However, as they attacked she gave birth to a fully formed and armed Huitzilopochtli, who proceeded to kill his half-siblings. Mixcoatl was also related to 400 more gods, the Centzonmimixcoa, whom, together with his 3 brothers (all different from the ones named above) and their sister, he slew by ambush. Mixcoatl was also thought of as being the father of another important deity, Quetzalcoatl, the feathered serpent.

Quetzalcoatl's father Mixcoatl was murdered; Quetzalcoatl was informed by Cozcaquauhtli that "the uncles who had killed his father were Apanecatl, Zolton, and Cuilton."

Xipetotec, Camaxtle, Mixcoatl or Red Tezcatlipoca 

Originally the name of the first son of the creative couple Ometecuhtli and Omecihuatl is Tlatlauhca or Tlatlauhaqui-Tezcatlipoca (Red Tezcatlipoca), "Smoking red mirror."  Of obscure origin, this god is honored by the Tlaxcalans and Huejocinas with the name of Camaxtli (Camaxtle), and apparently a deity of Zapotlan, Xalisco, is widely known in almost all of Mesoamerica with the name of Xipetotec, 'Our Lord Flayed'.  His body is dyed yellow on one side and lined on the other, his face is carved, superficially divided into two parts by a narrow strip that runs from the forehead to the jawbone. His head wears a kind of hood of different colors with tassels that hang down his back. The Tlaxcala myth that refers to Camaxtle, a god identified as Xipe-Totec himself

It's difficult to discern if Camaxtle is the same Tlatlauhqui Tezcatlipoca-Xipetotec or Yayauhqui-Tezcatlipoca (Black Tezcatlipoca) who changes his name to Mixcoatl;  or Huitzilopochtli himself as identified by some informants and authors. The truth is that he is related to fire and hunting. After the destruction of the earth by water, came chaos. Everything was desolation. Humanity had died and the heavens were over the earth. When the gods saw that the heavens had fallen, they resolved to reach the center of the earth, opening four subterranean paths for this, and to enter these paths to lift them up. To reward such a great action, Tonacacihuatl and Tonacatecuhtli made their children the lords of the heavens and the stars, and the path that Tezcatlipoca and Quetzalcoatl traveled was marked by the Milky Way. And this great nebula was also called Mixcoatl or Iztac-Mixcoatl, 'white cloud snake'

Jerónimo de Mendieta determines that Iztac-Mixcoatl is the personification of the Milky Way, the inhabitant of Chicomoztoc that the Nahuas call ‘White Cloud Serpent’, since such is the shape of the great nebula in the sky. And Ilancueye is nothing more than the personification of the Earth.

Centzon Mimixcoa 
In Ce Tecpatl, after the Creation of the Fifth Sun in Teotihuacan, Camaxtle, one of the four gods, ascended to the Eighth Heaven and created four men and one woman to feed the Sun; But barely formed, they fell into the water, they returned to the sky and there was no war, frustrated by this attempt, Camaxtle struck a cane on a rock, and at the blow 400 Chichimecs Mimixcoa sprouted that populated the earth before the Aztecs. Camaxtle was able to do penance on the rock, drawing blood with maguey spikes, tongue and ears, and prayed to the gods that the four men and one woman created in the eighth heaven would come down to kill the barbarians to feed to the Sun.

The four men and one woman created in the Eighth Heaven are the five Mimixcoa who would later sacrifice the 400 Mimixcoa, called Chichimecs or Otomies.

In Ce Tecpatl, the Mimixcoa were born, their mother Iztac-Chalchiuhtlicue went into a cave (Chicomoztoc or Tlalocan) and gave birth to five other Mimixcoa called Cuauhtlicoauh; Mixcoatl; Cuitlachcihuatl; Tlotepe; and Apantecuhtli. After spending four days in the water, the five Mimixcoa were suckled by Mecitli, who by the text identifies with the Earth Goddess (Tlaltecuhtli or Coatlicue). And immediately the Sun ordered the 400 Mimixcoa; The Sun Tonatiuh gives them arrows and says: "Here it is with what they will serve me to drink, with what they will feed, and a shield. And the precious arrows cast in quetzal t-shirt feathers; in heron rowing feathers; in t-shirt feathers of zacuam; in tlauhquechol t-shirt feathers; and in xiuhtototl t-shirt feathers; and also she, the Earth (Tlaltecuhtli or Coatlicue), who is your mother", but the Centzon Mimixcoa did not do their duty, instead they get drunk on tzihuactli wine - a small maguey and have sex with women. And immediately, the Sun also orders the five who were born last, immediately gives them the maguey arrow and gives them the divine shield. The five Mimixcoa climb a mesquite tree where the 400 discover them, they exclaim: "Who are these who are such as us?", then the five hide in specific places: Cuauhtlicoauh takes shelter in a tree; Mixcoatl on the ground; Tlotepe in the mount; Apantecuhtli in the water; and Cuitlachcihuatl in a court of the Tlachtli ball court. Finally, the Centzon Mimixcoa are defeated by his five younger brothers, who served the Sun Tonatiuh, gave him a drink.

Ritual associations 
Quecholli, the 14th veintena, the 20-day Aztec month (November 19th Julian calendar, November 29th Gregorian calendar), was dedicated to Mixcoatl. The celebration for this month consisted of hunting and feasting in the countryside. The hunters would take the form of Mixcoatl by dressing like him, kindling a new fire to roast the hunted game. Along with these practices, a man and woman would be sacrificed to Mixcoatl at his temple.

Modern associations and references
In modern scientific nomenclature, the names Mixcoatl–Camaxtli have been assigned to:  
Camaxtli Patera, one of the paterae (shallow craters) on the Jovian moon of Io
Pseudoeurycea mixcoatl, a species of lungless salamander endemic to Mexico
Mixcoatlus barbouri, a species of viper endemic to Mexico (previously Cerrophidion barbouri). 
Mixcoatlus browni, a species of viper endemic to Mexico (previously Agkistrodon browni).

See also
Xipe Totec

Notes

References
 
 
 
 

Aztec gods
Fire gods
War gods
Hunting gods
Sky and weather gods
Stellar gods